The 1951 NCAA Tennis Championships were the 6th annual tournaments to determine the national champions of NCAA men's singles, doubles, and team collegiate tennis in the United States.

USC won the team championship, the Trojans' second title. USC finished two points ahead of Cincinnati (9–7).

Host site
This year's tournaments were contested at the Vandy Christie Tennis Center at Northwestern University in Evanston, Illinois.

Team scoring
Until 1977, the men's team championship was determined by points awarded based on individual performances in the singles and doubles events.

References

External links
List of NCAA Men's Tennis Champions

NCAA Division I tennis championships
NCAA Division I Tennis Championships
NCAA Division I Tennis Championships